Kalpesh is an Indian masculine given name.

The following are people called "Kalpesh":

 Kalpesh Parekh, Indian dubbing artist
 Kalpesh Patel,  Kenyan cricketer
 Kalpesh Patel (Indian cricketer)
 Kalpesh Satyendra Jhaveri, Indian Judge

References

Hindu given names
Indian masculine given names